Jeremy Hooker (born 1941 in Warsash, Hampshire) is an English poet, critic, teacher, and broadcaster. Central to his work are a concern with the relationship between personal identity and place.

Hooker taught at the University of Wales, Aberystwyth, the University of Groningen in the Netherlands, Bath College of Higher Education, Le Moyne College, New York State, and University of Glamorgan, from which he retired in 2008.

Biography 
Hooker grew up on the edge of the New Forest village of Pennington, about two miles north of Lymington. After studying at the University of Southampton, Hooker lectured at the University of Wales, Aberystwyth. First living in Aberystwyth, but then in 1969 moving to the nearby Welsh-speaking parish of Llangwyryfon. Hooker left Llangwyrfron around 1980, when he spent two years as a creative writing fellow at Winchester School of Art.

In 1984 he left the University of Wales, Aberystwyth. Subsequently, he lived for a while in the Netherlands, teaching at the University of Groningen, before moving to Frome in 1989 and teaching creative writing at the Bath College of Higher Education. This later became Bath Spa University and he was the first director of its MA in Creative Writing. Jeremy Hooker spent the academic year 1994/5 teaching at Le Moyne College in upstate New York. More recently he was a professor at the University of Glamorgan, from where he retired in 2008, becoming Emeritus Professor of the University.

Hooker remains active, and has continued to publish poetry and prose, including contributions to various periodicals, since retiring.

Works
A concern with place and landscape, in relation to personal identity, is central to both Hooker's poetry and to his critical writing, as is "the relation between poetry and the sacred".

He has published eleven full length collections of poetry (including selected and collected works), critical studies of 
John Cowper Powys and David Jones, as well as collections of literary essays.  He has also edited works by Richard Jefferies, Edward Thomas, Frances Bellerby, Wilfred Owen. In addition Hooker has been involved with works for radio, including "A Map of David Jones".

When asked, in an interview, about influences Hooker listed Richard Jeffries, Thomas Hardy, Edward Thomas and later David Jones, along with the American Objectivist poets William Carlos Williams and George Oppen. Hooker began reading Jefferies when he was twelve. Another important early influence was the fact that Hooker's father was a landscape painter, who had a great love of Constable.

The move to Wales in 1965 was important for Hooker's development both as poet and as critic, and during the 1970s he established himself as an important critic of Welsh writing in English and was involved with teaching a course in this literature, which had been created by Ned Thomas at Aberytwyth.

But the tension of being a "foreigner" in Wales led Hooker selling the house in Llangwyryfon, in 1980: "I owe no place more than Llangwyryfon, but it has taken eleven years of living there, in an agricultural and predominantly Welsh-speaking community, for us to realise that our particular kind of dislocation can't be mended by settling permanently where other people belong". While living there he published three books of poetry that deal with his earlier experience of life in Southern England: Soliloquies of a Chalk Giant (1974) (winner in 1974 of the Welsh Arts Council Literature Prize), Landscape of the Daylight Moon (1978), Solent Shore (1978), and a fourth collection that focussed more on his experience of living in Wales: Englishman's Road (1980).

Bibliography

Poems
 Poetry Introduction, number 1.  With John Cotton; John Daniel; Douglas Dunn; Elaine Feinstein; Ian Hamilton; David Harsent;  V.C Horwell; Bartholomew Quinn. London: Faber & Faber, 1969.
 The Elements  (Triskel Poets) (pamphlet). Davies 1972.
 Soliloquies of a Chalk Giant. London: Enitharmon, 1974.
 Landscape of the Daylight Moon.  London: Enitharmon, 1978.
 Solent Shore. Manchester: Carcanet, 1978.
 Englishman's Road.  Manchester: Carcanet, 1980.
 A view from the Source: Selected Poems. Manchester: Carcanet, 1982.
 Itchen Water. (pamphlet)  Winchester: Winchester School of Art Press, 1982.
 Their Silence a Language (with the artist Lee Grandjean).  Ipswich: Ipswich Borough Council, 1990. 
 Master of the Leaping Figures. Petersfield, Hampshire: Enitharmon, 1987.
 Groundwork  with Lee Grandjean (Illustrator) Nottingham: Djanogly Art Gallery, 1998.
 Adamah. London: Enitharmon, 2002 
 Our Lady of Europe. London: Enitharmon, 1997.
 Arnolds Wood.  Birmingham: Flarestack, 2005
 The Cut of the Light. Poems 1965–2005. London: Enitharmon, 2006.
 Scattered Light. London: Enitharmon, 2015

Literary studies and essays
 John Cowper Powys. Cardiff: University of Wales Press (for the Welsh Arts Council) 1973.
 David Jones : An Exploratory Study of the Writings.  London: Enitharmon, 1975.
 John Cowper Powys and David Jones: A Comparative Study.  London: Enitharmon, 1979.
 Poetry of Place : Essays and Reviews 1970–1981. London: Carcanet, 1982.
 The presence of the past : Essays on Modern British and American Poetry. Bridgend, Wales: Poetry Wales Press, c1987.
 Imagining Wales : A View of Modern Welsh Writing in  English. Cardiff: University of Wales Press, 2001.
 Welsh Journal. Bridgend, Wales: Seren, 2001.
 Upstate: A North American Journal. Exeter,  Devon: Shearsman Books, 2007.
 Openings: A European Journal. Exeter, Devon: Shearsman Books, 2014
 Ditch Vision: Essays on Poetry, Nature, and Place. Stroud: Awen, 2017.

Works edited by 
 Alun Lewis,   Selected Poems.  Selected by Jeremy Hooker and Gweno Lewis; foreword by Robert Graves; afterword by Jeremy Hooker.  London: Unwin, 1981.
 Frances Bellerby, Selected Stories. Edited and introduced by Jeremy Hooker,  London: Enitharmon  1997. 
 Alun Lewis Inwards Where All the Battle is: A Selection of Alun Lewis's Writings from India.  Jeremy Hooker, ed., David Gentleman, Illustrations.  Newtown: Gwasg Gregynog, 1997.
Jefferies, Richard,   At Home on the Earth: A New Selection of the Later Writings of Richard Jeffries. Selected and introduced by Jeremy Hooker ; with illustrations by Agnes Miller Parker. Totnes, Devon: Green Books,  2001.
Edward Thomas,   The Ship of Swallows : A Selection of Short Stories, edited and introduced by Jeremy Hooker; Preface by Myfanwy Thomas. London: Enitharmon,  2005.
 Richard Jefferies. The Story of My Heart: My Autobiography.  Introduction by Jeremy Hooker. 
 Wilfred Owen, Mapping Golgotha : Letters & Poems.  Selected, edited, and with an introduction by Jeremy Hooker; illustrated by Harry Brockway. Newtown, Powys: Gwasg Gregynog, 2007.

Essays in collections 
 The Experience of Landscape, Paintings, Drawings and Photographs from The Arts council Collection (exhibition catalogue) London: South Bank Centre, 1987.
 Art of Edward Thomas. Jonathan Barker, ed.. Wales: Poetry Wales Press, 1987.
 Poetry in the British Isles: Non-Metropolitan Perspectives edited by Hans Werner Ludwig and Lothar Fietz. Cardiff: University of Wales Press, 1995. 
 Word Play Place : Essays on the Poetry of John Matthias, ed. Robert Thomas Archambeau. Athens, USA: Swallow Press, 1998.

Miscellaneous 
 David T. Lloyd. "Interview", Writing on the Edge: Interviews with Writers and Editors of Wales. Amersterdam and Atlanta: Rodopi, 1997.
 Christopher Meredith, ed. Moment of Earth: Poems and Essays in Honour of Jeremy Hooker. Aberystwyth: Celtic Studies, 2007.

References

External links
 https://www.poetryarchive.org/poet/jeremy-hooker
 http://www.poetryfoundation.org
 https://m.soundcloud.com/jeremyhooker/sets/jeremy-hooker-live-at-the *

1941 births
Living people
English male poets
Anglo-Welsh poets
Books of literary criticism
British literary critics